Al Twar is a locality in Dubai, United Arab Emirates (UAE). Located in eastern Dubai in Deira, Al Twar borders Dubai International Airport to the south, Al Qusais to the north, Hor Al Anz to the west and Muhaisnah to the east. It is bounded to the north and south by routes D 93 (Al Nahda Road) and D 91 (Abu Hail Road) respectively. Al Twar contains three sub-communities:

 Al Twar 1
 Al Twar 2
 Al Twar 3

Al Twar is considered an expensive residential area in Dubai and home to many well known Dubai businessmen. It is predominantly a residential community. Landmarks in Al Twar include Al Wafa Hypermarket and Dubai Police headquarters as well as a state of the art indoor sports facility where residents of the area partake in sporting tournaments in Football, Table Tennis, Badminton and even Soap Football. Captain Majid is a common idol amongst the youth in the area. Al Twar also has parks such as the Al Twar Park.

References 

Communities in Dubai